Black Mafia is the second album released by rap duo Steady Mobb'n. It was released on November 24, 1998, through No Limit Records, and was produced by Beats By the Pound and Meech Wells; according to group member Billy Bavgate, the record was completed in one week. The only released single, "Ghetto Life", was a minor hit, but the album failed to match the major success of their 1997 debut Pre-Meditated Drama, peaking at #82 on the Billboard 200 and #19 on the Top R&B/Hip-Hop Albums. Steady Mobb'n departed No Limit thereafter. Most critics blame the albums lackluster sales and weak delivery on the account of DJ Daryl not being present on the album. Black Mafia had sold 21,000 copies in its first week.

Track listing 
 "Ghetto Life"- 4:37 (featuring Snoop Dogg, Odell & Master P) 
 "Bout Dat Mess"- 3:13 (featuring Fiend, Big Ed & Mac) 
 "Still Hustlin'"- 3:56  (featuring Renzo of Sons of Funk) 
 "When Them Killas Call"- 3:45 (featuring C-Murder)
 "Niggas Like Me"- 4:28 (featuring Mystikal & Silkk the Shocker)
 "Papa Didn't Raise No Punks"- 3:12 (featuring C-Murder)
 "Lil' Niggas"- 3:04 (featuring Master P & Lil Soldiers) 
 "Plead My Case"- 3:51 (featuring Magic & Craig B)
 "Heaven or Hell"- 3:48 (featuring Mo B. Dick) 
 "Carry On"- 4:30 (featuring Mr. Serv-On, Odell and Ms. Peaches)
 "Light Green and Remy"- 4:12 (featuring Snoop Dogg) 
 "Stick Up"- 2:46 (featuring Freedom) 
 "Turn Me Up"- 4:18 (featuring Snoop Dogg) 
 "Family Ties"- 4:36 (featuring Gambino Family) 
 "No One"- 3:17 (featuring Silkk the Shocker and Ms. Peaches) 
 "Crosses Artist"- 3:44 (featuring Full Blooded) 
 "MG Theme"- 3:47 (featuring Mean Green and Mo B. Dick) 
 "Hit a Lick"- 3:15 (featuring Prime Suspects)

References

1998 albums
No Limit Records albums
Priority Records albums
Steady Mobb'n albums